

General Staff
Hellenic Army General StaffΓενικό Επιτελείο Στρατού (ΓΕΣ)
Chief-of-Staff of the ArmyΑρχηγός ΓΕΣ
Inspector General of the ArmyΓενικός Επιθεωρητής Στρατού / Διοικητής ΔΙΔΟΕΕ
1st Deputy Chief-of-Staff of the ArmyA' Υπαρχηγός ΓΕΣ
2nd Deputy Chief-of-Staff of the ArmyΒ' Υπαρχηγός ΓΕΣ

Branches of the Army

Combat and Combat Support branches are called Arms (Όπλον). 
Service Support and Logistic Support branches are called Corps (Σώμα).
The Logistic Support branches do not have units.

Combat Arms (Όπλα Μάχης)

Infantry Arm (includes Special Forces)Όπλον Πεζικού (ΠΖ) Ειδικές Δυνάμεις (ΕΔ) - Special Forces including commandos, paratroopers and marines.
Armor - Cavalry ArmΌπλον Ιππικού-Τεθωρακισμένων (ΤΘ)
Artillery ArmΌπλον Πυροβολικού (ΠΒ)

Combat Support Arms (Όπλα υποστήριξης μάχης)

Αrmy Aviation ArmΌπλον Αεροπορίας Στρατού (ΑΣ)
Engineers ArmΌπλον Μηχανικού (ΜΧ)
Signals ArmΌπλον Διαβιβάσεων (ΔΒ)

Service Support Corps (Σώματα Υποστήριξης Μάχης)

Technical CorpsΣώμα Τεχνικού (ΤΧ)
Supply and Transportation CorpsΣώμα Εφοδιασμού Μεταφορών (ΕΜ)
Ordnance CorpsΣώμα Υλικού Πολέμου (ΥΠ)
Medical CorpsΣώμα Υγειονομικού (ΥΓ)
Research and Informatics CorpsΣώμα Έρευνας Πληροφορικής (ΕΠ)

Logistic Corps (Σώματα Διοικητικής Μέριμνας)

Finance CorpsΣώμα Οικονομικού (Ο)
Audit CorpsΣώμα Ελεγκτικού (Ε)
Post Office CorpsΣώμα Ταχυδρομικού (ΤΔ)
Quartermaster CorpsΣώμα Φροντιστών
Medical Logistic and Administrative personnel CorpsΣώμα Διαχειριστών Διοικητικών Υγειονομικού
Music CorpsΜουσικό Σώμα
Arms Master Technicians Corps Σώμα Αρχιτεχνικών Οπλων
Corps Master Technicians Corps Σώμα Αρχιτεχνικών Σωμάτων
Geography CorpsΓεωγραφικό Σώμα
Military Secretaries and Translators CorpsΣώμα Στρατιωτικών Γραμματέων - Διερμηνέων

External links
 Hellenic Ministry of Defense - Official Site
 Hellenic National Defense General Staff - Official Site
 Hellenic Army General Staff - Official Site

Hellenic Army
Hellenic Army